Itsuwa may refer to:

Itsuwa, Kumamoto, a former town in Amakusa District, Kumamoto Prefecture, Japan
Itsuwa (A Certain Magical Index), a character in the light novel series A Certain Magical Index

People with the surname
, Japanese singer-songwriter

Japanese-language surnames